Peveril Point is a promontory on the east-facing coast of the Isle of Purbeck in Dorset, England, and is part of the town of Swanage. It forms the southern end of Swanage Bay. It is located at   OS Grid Ref: SZ 041 787.

The rocks that make up Peveril Point are shale and  Portland and Purbeck limestone in a syncline structure. This has resisted erosion more than the adjacent clay of Swanage Bay; whilst the clay has eroded away over time, the limestone has remained as a promontory.

On top of Peveril Point is a National Coastwatch Institution lookout. The point is also home to the  Swanage lifeboat organisation.

Peveril Point contains tunnels connecting disused gun emplacements which defended the entrance to Southampton Water from the west of the Isle of Wight during World War II.

References 

Isle of Purbeck
Headlands of Dorset
Jurassic Coast
Swanage